Greenport may refer any of the following

Netherlands
 Greenport (Netherlands), a cluster of economic areas focussed around horticulture facilities and production

United States
 Greenport, Columbia County, New York
 Greenport, Suffolk County, New York
Greenport (LIRR station)
 Greenport West, New York